Collinwood is a city in Wayne County, Tennessee, United States. The population was 982 at the 2010 census, down from 1,024 in 2000.

History

Collinwood was established in 1913 as a stop on the Tennessee Western Railroad, a rail line constructed to serve the area iron industry.  The city was named for W.W. Collins, president of the Collinwood Land Company, which platted the city.  While the railroad, which intersected the L&N system at Iron City, was originally to extend northward to Hohenwald, plans for extension beyond Collinwood never materialized, and the city became the railroad's western terminus.

The Collinwood Land Company advertised lots for the new city in June 1913, and by the following year, about 300 people were living in the city.  Most of the residents worked for the railroad or in the local lumber industry.  During World War I, Collinwood's economy boomed, and its population swelled to over 2,000.  A wood alcohol (methanol) distillation plant and blast furnace were constructed in the years following the war, but as demand for these products fell, the economy collapsed and the city began to decline.  The tracks connecting Collinwood with the L&N system were abandoned in the late 1930s.

The Collinwood Railroad Station, built in 1916, still stands near the city of the city, and is listed on the National Register of Historic Places.  The station, which mostly follows design patterns typical of L&N depots of the period, is the last major remnant of the area's railroad history.  The station now serves as a library and museum.

Geography
Collinwood is located at  (35.170153, -87.742731).  The city is situated on a relatively broad plain surrounded by low hills and hollows.  Streams in the eastern part of the city are part of the Shoal Creek watershed, while streams in the western part are tributaries of Indian Creek (both Shoal Creek and Indian Creek empty into the Tennessee River).

Collinwood is concentrated along a stretch of State Route 13, roughly halfway between Waynesboro to the north and the Tennessee-Alabama state line to the south. State Route 203 intersects SR 13 at the southern tip of Collinwood, connecting the city with Savannah to the west.  The Natchez Trace Parkway traverses Collinwood from northeast to southwest.

Demographics

2020 census

As of the 2020 United States census, there were 898 people, 426 households, and 298 families residing in the city.

2000 census
As of the census of 2000, there were 1,024 people, 428 households, and 297 families residing in the city. The population density was 365.9 people per square mile (141.2/km2). There were 473 housing units at an average density of 169.0 per square mile (65.2/km2). The racial makeup of the city was 98.24% White, 0.20% Native American, 0.10% Asian, 0.88% from other races, and 0.59% from two or more races. Hispanic or Latino of any race were 1.56% of the population.

There were 428 households, out of which 30.6% had children under the age of 18 living with them, 52.8% were married couples living together, 13.1% had a female householder with no husband present, and 30.6% were non-families. 27.6% of all households were made up of individuals, and 13.3% had someone living alone who was 65 years of age or older. The average household size was 2.39 and the average family size was 2.88.

In the city, the population was spread out, with 23.7% under the age of 18, 10.9% from 18 to 24, 26.4% from 25 to 44, 25.1% from 45 to 64, and 13.9% who were 65 years of age or older. The median age was 38 years. For every 100 females, there were 88.6 males. For every 100 females age 18 and over, there were 86.4 males.

The median income for a household in the city was $22,305, and the median income for a family was $31,296. Males had a median income of $30,052 versus $18,269 for females. The per capita income for the city was $13,716. About 10.4% of families and 16.8% of the population were below the poverty line, including 17.2% of those under age 18 and 21.2% of those age 65 or over.

Businesses/places of interest
Ralph M. Hughes Memorial Park
Collinwood City Park—Also known as Dixie Youth Park (Swimming, Tennis, and Baseball)
Wayne County Welcome Center
Collinwood Depot Library/Museum
The Natchez Trace Parkway
Hasti-Mart
Roadhouse Express
Dollar General
Piggly Wiggly
The Dragonfly Emporium
Andy’s Barbershop

Churches

This is an incomplete list of churches located in the city of Collinwood.
Cornerstone Church of Collinwood 
Collinwood Church of God 
Collinwood Church of Christ 
Collinwood United Methodist Church
Collinwood Free Will Baptist Church

Education
Collinwood High
Collinwood Middle
Collinwood Elementary
Bevis Education Center

Manufacturing
Hassell and Hughes
Dixie Handle Company

Highways and parkways
Natchez Trace Parkway
 Tennessee State Route 13
 Tennessee State Route 203

Radio station
FM 94.9 WMSR-FM

References

External links

Municipal Technical Advisory Service entry for Collinwood – information on local government, elections, and link to charter

Cities in Tennessee
Cities in Wayne County, Tennessee